Butt-Ugly Martians: Zoom or Doom is a 2002 racing video game released by Runecraft. The game is based on the computer animated television series Butt-Ugly Martians.

 Gameplay 
The gameplay of Zoom or Doom focuses mainly on competitive racing, there are seven different racers in which two have to be unlocked by the player by racing as certain characters and winning the cup, each with different vehicle statistics such as handling, acceleration and maximum speed. There is also a time attack mode; a practice mode; a mode where a player races on their own without CPU racers and a multiplayer mode, which allows the player to race with another person. An autosave feature is not present, meaning the player has to manually save the game or else all progress will be lost.

 Cast 
The video game features the following voice actors, with the cast from the television series returning; in addition, there are some characters original to the Zoom or Doom'' game.

B-Bop A-Luna, played by Charlie Schlatter.

Wick-R Boo, played by Jerry Trainor.

Do-Wah Diddy, Jax the Conqueror, and Gorgon, all played by Jess Harnell.

Dr. Damage and Emperor Bog, both played by Scott Bullock.

Stenk Puker and The Kill-R, both played by Bob Odenkirk.

2T FRu-T and Chitzok, played by Rob Paulsen.

Stoat Muldoon, played by Geoff Pierson.

References 

2002 video games
Action video games
GameCube games
PlayStation 2 games
Racing video games
Video games based on animated television series
Video games developed in the United Kingdom
Multiplayer and single-player video games

Crave Entertainment games